Black Callerton is a hamlet and former civil parish about 5 miles from Newcastle upon Tyne, now in the parish of Woolsington, in the Newcastle upon Tyne district, in the county of Tyne and Wear, England. In 1951 the parish had a population of 365.

History 
The name "Callerton" means 'Calves' hill, the "Black" part distinguishes it from High and Little Callerton. Black Callerton is possibly a shrunken medieval village, although there is no indications on the ground. The earliest reference to the settlement dates from 1246. Black Callerton was formerly a township in the parish of Newburn, from 1866 Black Callerton was a civil parish in its own right until it was abolished and merged with Woolsington on 1 April 1955. In 1974 it became part of Tyne and Wear, having previously been part of Northumberland.

References 

Hamlets in Tyne and Wear
Former civil parishes in Tyne and Wear
Geography of Newcastle upon Tyne